Krasnohorivka is a village in Pokrovsk Raion (district) in Donetsk Oblast of eastern Ukraine, at 24.7 km NNW from the centre of Donetsk city.

The War in Donbass, that started in mid-April 2014, has brought along both civilian and military casualties.

Demographics
In 2001 the settlement had 526 inhabitants. Native language distribution as of the Ukrainian Census of 2001:
Ukrainian: 11.98%
 Russian: 80.42%
Armenian and Moldavian: 0.57%

References

Villages in Pokrovsk Raion